Astro IPTV is an Internet Protocol Television service by the Malaysian satellite television provider, Astro. Launched on 20 April 2011 as Astro B.yond IPTV, its subscribers were entitled to high definition Astro channels, personal video recording, video-on-demand, high-speed internet, and voice services. Astro's initial target audiences were residences of high-rise buildings who previously had difficulty accessing HDTV services. By offering HDTV services with its IPTV, Astro was able to bring HDTV to these high-rise residences. This was made possible by partnering with Maxis Berhad (April 2013). Astro B.yond IPTV was rebranded to Astro IPTV in February 2014.

History 
A brief history of Astro leading up to the launch of Astro IPTV.
1996 - Astro was launched.
June 2007 - Launch of Astro on Demand - providing Video on Demand services.
November 2009 - Transmission of HD channels for the first time on Astro.
December 2009 - Astro B.yond was launched.
June 2010 - Astro launches Personal Video Recorder
April 2011 - Astro reached 5 million subscribers (15% of Malaysia's population)
April 2011 - Astro B.yond introduces IPTV services (Astro B.yond IPTV) in collaboration with TIME dotCom Berhad.
March 2013 - Astro On-The-Go is launched.
April 2013 - Astro partners with Maxis Berhad to expand their reach.
February 2014 - Astro B.yond IPTV gets rebranded to Astro IPTV.

Astro IPTV Broadband Providers

TIME Broadband 
When Astro IPTV was launched in April 2011, Astro Berhad initially partnered with TIME broadband for its fibre broadband services. At the time of launch, TIME broadband made it possible for Astro IPTV to reach approximately 60 high-rise condominiums (roughly 11,000 homes), all of which are within Mont Kiara, Kuala Lumpur city centre, Bangsar, and Penang.

The offered broadband speeds by TIME Broadband were 3Mbit/s, 10Mbit/s, 20Mbit/s, and 30Mbit/s. Each subscriber is entitled to a bandwidth boost of 10Mbit/s up to 30 hours each month. The broadband packages also comes with a voice plan and a free DECT phone. However, TIME broadband services are limited to a certain areas around Malaysia only.

Maxis Broadband 
In April 2013, Astro partnered with Maxis Berhad, making Astro IPTV available to all of Maxis’ subscribers. With this new partnership, more than 1 million households in Malaysia were able to get Astro IPTV services. Currently Maxis offers 10Mbit/s, 20Mbit/s, and 30 Mbit/s for Astro IPTV subscribers.

Before partnering with Astro, Maxis launched their own IPTV service. This was in partnership with 14 content providers including but not limited to, Radio Televisyen Malaysia (RTM), All Asia Multimedia Networks FZ-LLC, and Media Prima Berhad. However this was not nearly enough, in comparison to the content that was being provided by the then Astro-TIME partnership for Astro IPTV.

Features

Broadband Services
Subscribers are required to choose between Maxis or TIME broadband upon registration. Depending on area of residence, subscribers may have no choice as to which broadband provider they would like to use. Both providers are able to provide users with 10Mbit/s, 20Mbs, and 30Mbit/s while only TIME broadband offers a 10Mbit/s bandwidth boost for 30 hours a month.

References

External links
Astro Official Website
Online Football Channel
IPTV Gang

Digital television
Streaming television
Video on demand services
2011 establishments in Malaysia